Protosynaema is a genus of moths of the family Plutellidae.

Species 
Species in the genus Protosynaema include:
Protosynaema eratopis Meyrick, 1886 (from New Zealand)
Protosynaema hymenopis Meyrick, 1935 (from New Zealand)
Protosynaema matutina Philpott, 1928(from New Zealand)
Protosynaema quaestuosa Meyrick, 1924(from New Zealand)
Protosynaema steropucha Meyrick, 1886 (from New Zealand)

References

Moth genera
Plutellidae
Taxa named by Edward Meyrick